Mafioso may refer to:

 A mafioso is a mobster that is a member (i.e. a "made man") of the Sicilian Mafia, Italian-American Mafia, or other Italian criminal organizations.
 Mafioso (film), a 1962 Italian black comedy film
 Mafioso rap, a hip hop music subgenre of gangsta rap

See also
 Mafia (disambiguation)